August Theodor Eichhorn (30 July 1899 − 16 June 1980) was a German musician and professor for violoncello.

Life 
Born in Mainz, from 1933 until he was drafted into the military in 1942 Eichhorn was solo cellist at Leipzig's Gewandhaus and taught at the University of Music and Theatre Leipzig. He also taught at the Hochschule für Musik und Darstellende Kunst Mannheim and continued as a guest in Leipzig until 1961. His students included Reinhold Johannes Buhl, Siegfried Pank, Josef Schwab and Gerhard Mantel.

Eichhorn had a great influence on string pedagogy. He was one of the first whose teaching methods were based on scientific principles, the physiological possibilities of the human body and the physical conditions of the cello, as well as the findings of Steinhausen and Trendelenburg. For example, he coined the term "Trinity of Sound": it depends on the contact point, pressure and speed of the bow. He can be considered the founder of a new German cello school.

Eichhorn was one of the first students of Emanuel Feuermann in Cologne. This lever system can be characterised by the fact that the bow guiding arm is set into mass balancing oscillations. Figuratively, this can be imagined as a chain of connected rockers, so that the mass inertia to be overcome in the bow guidance is reduced to a minimum. In such a mobile-like system of coupled oscillators, small muscular impulses can already keep relatively large reactionary movements in motion. Eichhorn subsequently attempted to give his students systematic artistic progress by communicating his theories. The relevance of the use of Eichhorn's movement model for the training of artistic expertise was rudimentarily proven in studies using three-dimensional computer-aided movement analysis (see Hasselbach & Gruhn & Gollhofer 2010, 2011). However, a more recent study showed that in a study of professional violinists from several German orchestras, no significant correlation could be found between the degree of mass balancing oscillations (MBOs) and the position achieved in the orchestra or the orchestra's reputation. However, highly significant correlations were found between the level of MBOs and the presence or severity of a play-related illness. (cf. Hasselbach & Gruhn & Gollhofer 2019) Conclusion: Eichhorn's movement model in terms of a biomechanical topology (cf. Bernstein 1996 and Schack 2010) seems to be just one possible route among many to artistic expertise, but one of the healthiest routes under professional stress in the long term. Other variables such as personality or marketing strategies seem to have a greater influence on concrete professional success than the learned movement model.

Eichhorn died in Bensheim at the age of 80.

Sources 
 Margarete Hopfer: Die Klanggestaltung auf Streichinstrumenten. Das Naturgesetz der Tonansprache. Kurze Einführung in die gestaltende Dynamik der Bogenmechanik von August Eichhorn. Kistner & Siegel, Leipzig 1941.

Further reading 
 Jörg Clemen: Ein Orchester aus vierzig Celli. Symposium zum 100. Geburtstag August Eichhorns. In Neue Musikzeitung. H. 12/1999–1/2000, .
 Bernstein, N. (1996): Die Entwicklung der Bewegungsfertigkeiten. Translation chapter VIII froù N. A. Bernstein: O postrojenii dviženij (Über den Aufbau der Bewegungen). Medgiz, Moskau 1947 (Bearbeitung: G. Schnabel, H. Sandner; Translation: C. Bauer 1996/ J. Schlief 1958.) IAT/dvs, Leipzig 1996/1958.
 Hasselbach, J. v. (2009): 100 Jahre Physiologic Turn in der Streichinstrumentalpädagogik. Eine Bestandsaufnahme, in Interdisziplinarität als Herausforderung musikpädagogischer Forschung, ed. by N. Schläbitz, Essen (Die Blaue Eule), .
 Hasselbach, J. v. & Gruhn, W. & Gollhofer, A. (2010): Mass balancing oscillations: An indication of  expertise in the bowing of  violinists, in S. M. Demorest, S. J. Morrison & P. S. Campbell (Eds.), Proceedings of the 11th International Conference on Music Perception and Cognition (ICMPC11), University of Washington, Seattle, 23–27 September [CD-ROM].
 Hasselbach, J. v. & Gruhn, W. & Gollhofer, A. (2011): Effects of training on mass balancing oscillations in the bowing of (pre) teen violin students. A quantitative micromotion study, Arts BioMechanics, vol. 1 (1), New York (Nova Science Publishers), .
   Hasselbach, J. v. (2012): For 'lively' and 'intensely related' tones in bowed string instrumental performance. A response to Peter Röbke's introduction to Das Musizieren und die Gefhle, Arts BioMechanics, vol. 1 (2), New York (Nova Science Publishers), .
Hasselbach, J. v. & Gruhn, W. & Gollhofer, A. (2019): Mass balancing oscillations in the bowing of adult professional orchestra violinists: prevalence, tempo-related profiles and their relation to occupational health, Arts BioMechanics, vol. 2 (2), New York (Nova Science Publishers),.
 Hasselbach, J. v. (2019a). Stressing “unstressed”: Relaxed emphasis and lightness in the flow of movement – understanding meter via physical assistance and supported metrical sound experience in bowed string instrumental performance, Arts BioMechanics, vol. 2 (2), New York (Nova Science Publishers), .
 Hasselbach, J. v. (2019b): 'Masse balancierende Oszillationen in der Bogenführung von professionellen Violinist*innen. Ein biomechanisches Merkmal mit hohem Potential zur Reduktion des Risikos spielbedingter Erkrankungen, in Band zur Jahrestagung des AMPF 2018, edited by Verena Weidner & Christian Rolle, Münster (Waxmann) 2019, .
 Schack, T. (2010): Die Kognitive Architektur menschlicher Bewegungen''., Sportforum vol. 21, Aachen (Meyer & Meyer).

References

External links 
 

German classical cellists
1899 births
1980 deaths
Musicians from Mainz
20th-century classical musicians
20th-century cellists